Soumaya Akaaboune (born 16 February 1974) is a Moroccan actress.

Biography
Akaaboune was born and raised in Tangier, Morocco. Her mother was a stylist and costume designer while her father was an art lover. She described her childhood home as a sanctuary for artists and those in need. At the age of 14, Akaaboune was spotted by the choreographer Maurice Bejart, who invited her to join his dance troupe. She accepted and trained for eight hours a day, a period in which she said was the happiest of her life. Akaaboune toured Europe, dancing in Paris, then Spain and London. During her time in London, she turned her attention to theater, performing in several musicals. She snapped her Achilles tendon in 1989, ending her dancing career. In London, Akaaboune met Sandra Bernhard, who invited her to perform on her show "Up All Night" and later the Broadway show "I'm Still Here...Damn It".

Akaaboune trained in acting at the Loft Studio. In 2010, she starred opposite Matt Damon in the film Green Zone. Akaaboune had roles in the romantic comedy Playing for Keeps in 2012 and the biopic Lovelace in 2013. She was one of the five housewives profiled on the 2013 French show Les Vraies Housewives. Between 2015 and 2016, Akaaboune starred as Fettouma in the popular soap opera Wadii, directed by Yassine Ferhanne. Her character is a bourgeois woman who refuses to accept injustice, and the show received 7 million views per episode. In 2019, she played Marcelle in the TV series The Spy.

Akaaboune met the film producer Peter Rodger in 1999. The pair subsequently married and had a son, Jazz. Akaaboune was the stepmother of Elliot Rodger, the perpetrator of the 2014 Isla Vista killings. The two had a strained relationship, and Elliot Rodger had also planned to murder Akaaboune. She returned to Morocco at the end of 2014. Akaaboune speaks French, Arabic, English and Spanish.

Filmography
Films
1987: Dernier été à Tanger
1999:  Moroccan Chronicles 
1999: Esther
2010: When the Voices Fade (short film): Leila
2010: Green Zone: Sanaa
2012: Playing for Keeps: Aracelli
2013: Lovelace
2013: Djinn
2017: Catch the Wind: Madame Saïni
2017: Looking for Oum Kulthum

Television
2013: Les Vraies Housewives
2015–2016: Waadi: Fettouma 
2017–2018: Rdat L'walida: Faty Kenani
2019: EZZAIMA
2019: The Spy: Marcelle
2020: Bab Al Bahar: Zineb

References

External links
Soumaya Akaaboune at the Internet Movie Database

1974 births
Living people
20th-century Moroccan actresses
21st-century Moroccan actresses
Moroccan film actresses
Moroccan television actresses
People from Tangier